Vergüenza is a Spanish comedy television series starring Malena Alterio and Javier Gutiérrez. The fiction follows the developments in the marriage formed by Jesús (Gutiérrez) and Nuria (Alterio). Created, written and directed by Álvaro Fernández Armero and Juan Cavestany, the first season aired on Movistar+ in 2017.

Premise 
Jesús Gutiérrez is an awkward man working as photographer for hire in weddings, baptisms and (first) communions, normally unaware of the cringe he causes in others because of his clumsiness, while his wife Nuria suffers from the consequences of the former.

The fiction is set in Madrid at the present time.

Cast

Production and release 
While Fernández Armero has a substantial TV career, Vergüenza was Cavestany's debut in television.
The first season of the series consisted of ten episodes, with a running time ranging from 22 to 26 minutes. The idea for the series predated the actual release by nearly ten years.

The filming took place in locations of Madrid and the wider Community of Madrid in 2016.

The full first season of the series was originally released under video-on-demand by Movistar+ on 24 November 2017.

The series spawned a Mexican adaptation, Pena ajena.

Awards and nominations

References 
Citations

Bibliography
 

Television shows set in Madrid
Movistar+ original programming
2017 Spanish television series debuts
2020 Spanish television series endings
Television shows filmed in Spain
2010s Spanish comedy television series
2020s Spanish comedy television series